The 2017 Bloomsburg Huskies football team represents Bloomsburg University in the PSAC East division.

Background

Previous season
In 2016 the Huskies were 6–5 and 4–3 in PSAC play.

Recruits

Transfers

Incoming recruiting class

Schedule

References

Bloomsburg
Bloomsburg Huskies football seasons
Bloomsburg Huskies football